Ina D .D. Uhthoff (née Campbell) (1889 – 1971) was a Scots-Canadian painter. A contemporary of Emily Carr, Uhthoff was known for establishing her own art school; the Victoria School of Art, writing columns for the Daily Colonist newspaper, and exhibiting her own art.

Biography
Uhthoff was born in 1889 in Kirn, Argyll, Scotland. She grew up in Glasgow, graduating from Glasgow School of Art in 1912. Following her graduation she exhibited at the Royal Glasgow Institute of the Fine Arts and the Royal Scottish Academy.

In 1913 Uhthoff traveled to the Kootenays in British Columbia to visit friends. While there she met the homesteader, Edward Joseph (Ted) Uhthoff.

With the outbreak of World War I Uhthoff returned to Glasgow, where she taught elementary school.

In 1919 Ina and Ted were married, returned to British Columbia, and started a family.

In 1926 Uhthoff relocated to Victoria with her two children. There she continued her teaching career, providing private lessons, teaching at public and private schools, and a correspondence course. She called her private studio the Victoria School of Art which operated from 1926 to 1942. She was forced to close the school at the beginning of World War II.

In the late 1920s she worked with Emily Carr to bring Mark Tobey from Seattle, Washington to teach a class.

In 1934, Ina's work appeared in the Vancouver Art Gallery's 3rd. Annual B.C Artists exhibit (Alpine Meadows, Windswept Tree) alongside Group Of Seven artist Fred Varley.

In 1945 Uhthoff began running a small gallery called the Little Centre, a precursor to the Art Gallery of Greater Victoria. She served on the board of directors into the 1960s.

Concurrent with her teaching career, Uhthoff exhibited her own work at the British Columbia Society of Artists, and at the Art Gallery of Greater Victoria.

Uhthoff died in 1971 in Carleton Place, Ontario

Legacy
In 1972 the Art Gallery of Greater Victoria held a memorial exhibition of her work.

Her work is currently held in the Burnaby Art Gallery and Victoria Art Gallery

In 2017 her work was included in the exhibition, The Ornament of a House: Fifty Years of Collecting at the Burnaby Art Gallery.

References

External links
 Ina D.D. Uhthoff images on Invaluable

1889 births
1971 deaths
20th-century Canadian women artists
20th-century Canadian painters
Canadian women painters
British emigrants to Canada